Saleema Nawaz (born 1979) is a Canadian author whose works of short fiction have been published in literary journals such as Prairie Fire, PRISM International, Grain, The Dalhousie Review,  and The New Quarterly.  Nawaz was born in Ottawa, Ontario and later moved to Winnipeg, Manitoba in order to study English at the University of Manitoba, where she received her M.A. with a creative  writing thesis. Her first complete collection of short fiction, entitled Mother Superior, was published by Freehand Books in 2008. Nawaz completed her first novel, Bone and Bread, published by Anansi Press in 2013, while residing in Montreal, Quebec.

Biography

Early life in Ottawa
Saleema Nawaz was born in Ottawa, Ontario, Canada. An only child, Nawaz was raised solely by her Caucasian Nova Scotian mother in the Ottawa neighbourhood of Centretown, in the absence of her Indian father. Nawaz claims to have begun showing interest in writing fiction as early as the first grade. During her high school years she attended Lisgar Collegiate Institute, a highly regarded public school near her Centretown home. Upon graduation from high school Nawaz attended Carleton University in Ottawa, where she graduated with a Bachelor of Humanities.

Winnipeg, Banff, and Montreal 
After receiving a Bachelor of Humanities at Carleton, Nawaz moved to Winnipeg, Manitoba to pursue her M.A. at the University of Manitoba. The M.A. program at the University of Manitoba interested Nawaz because it offered a Creative Thesis option. Since obtaining her degree, Nawaz has attended a writing studio program at the Banff Centre for the Arts and currently resides in Montreal, Quebec where she does administrative work for McGill University.

Writing career

Influences
Nawaz cites her biggest short fiction influences as Alice Munro, Tobias Wolff, and Raymond Carver.

Early work
Nawaz' novella The White Dress (which would later appear in her collection, Mother Superior) won her the Robert Kroetsch Award for Best Creative Thesis in 2006. This award is given to the writer of the best creative thesis each year out of all University of Manitoba M.A. graduates. In the following years, Nawaz published several individual short stories in various literary publications across Canada (see "List of published works" below).

Mother Superior
In 2008, Nawaz published a collection of seven stories and two novellas entitled Mother Superior. The collection includes five previously published short stories as well as two previously unpublished short stories and two previously unpublished novellas. Mother Superior has generally been met with positive reviews, was a finalist for the prestigious McAuslan First Book Prize from the Quebec Writers' Federation. The stories in Mother Superior follow a diverse cast of female protagonists struggling with issues such as racism, abuse, death, anorexia, pregnancy and motherhood. Mother Superior is published by Freehand Books.

Bone and Bread
Nawaz's first novel was called Bone and Bread was edited by Melanie Little Anansi's former senior fiction editor. Its narrative follows two sisters and is set in Montreal. The sisters are from her previously published short story "Bloodlines" (found in The New Quarterly and as a part of Mother Superior) twenty years after their original story. In 2016, Bone and Bread was defended by Farah Mohamed on CBC's Canada Reads competition.

Songs for the End of the World 
Nawaz's most recent novel, which took her seven years to write, is a dystopian novel about a coronavirus that ravages the world. Given the 'eerie similarities' to the current COVID-19 pandemic, the publisher McClelland & Stewart decided to move up the publication of the e-book to April 14, 2020. The print book was released on August 25, 2020.

List of published works

Individual short stories
 "Mother Superior" in PRISM International
 "Look, But Don't Touch" in Grain
 "My Three Girls" in Prairie Fire
 "Bloodlines" in The New Quarterly
 "Scar Tissue" in The Dalhousie Review

Collections
 Mother Superior published by Freehand Books, 2008

Novels
 Bone and Bread (House of Anansi, 2013)
 Songs for the End of the World (McClelland & Stewart, 2020)

Awards and honours
 Winner of the inaugural Robert Kroetsch Award for Best Creative Thesis at the University of Manitoba for her novella "The White Dress", 2006.
 Winner of the Writers' Trust of Canada's McClelland & Stewart Journey Prize for her short story "My Three Girls", 2008.
 Placed second in the Malahat Review Novella Contest for her novella "The White Dress".
 Finalist for the Quebec Writers' Federation's McAuslan First Book Prize for her collection entitled Mother Superior, 2008.
 Winner of the Quebec Writers' Federation's Paragraphe Hugh MacLennan Prize for Fiction, 2013.

References

1979 births
Living people
Canadian women novelists
Writers from Ottawa
Canadian women short story writers
Canadian writers of Asian descent
Carleton University alumni
Lisgar Collegiate Institute alumni
21st-century Canadian short story writers
21st-century Canadian women writers
21st-century Canadian novelists